Luciano Ferreira Gabriel (born 18 October 1979 in Ribeirão Preto), known as Luciano Ratinho, is a Brazilian footballer. He plays for Anapolina.

Career
Luciano Ratinho previously played for Botafogo-SP, Corinthians, Juventude and Grêmio in the Campeonato Brasileiro.

Shandong Luneng
He scored his first goal for Shandong Luneng on September 27, 2008 vs Liaoning Hongyun as a substitute.

References

External links

1979 births
Living people
Brazilian footballers
Brazilian expatriate footballers
Chinese Super League players
Shandong Taishan F.C. players
Botafogo Futebol Clube (SP) players
Sport Club Corinthians Paulista players
Esporte Clube Juventude players
Grêmio Foot-Ball Porto Alegrense players
Daejeon Hana Citizen FC players
K League 1 players
Associação Atlética Portuguesa (Santos) players
Paysandu Sport Club players
Tupi Football Club players
Associação Chapecoense de Futebol players
Sertãozinho Futebol Clube players
América Futebol Clube (MG) players
Vila Nova Futebol Clube players
S.C. Beira-Mar players
Brazilian expatriate sportspeople in China
Expatriate footballers in South Korea
Expatriate footballers in China
Brazilian expatriate sportspeople in South Korea
Association football midfielders
People from Ribeirão Preto
Footballers from São Paulo (state)